Orbivestus is a genus of shrubs in the family Asteraceae, native to tropical Africa, the Arabian Peninsula and the Indian subcontinent. Its species were formerly placed in the genus Vernonia.

Species
, Plants of the World Online recognises the following species. In 2009, Robinson provisionally rejected the inclusion of Orbivestus undulatus.
Orbivestus albocinerascens 
Orbivestus bamendae 
Orbivestus blumeoides 
Orbivestus catumbensis 
Orbivestus cinerascens 
Orbivestus homilanthus 
Orbivestus karaguensis 
Orbivestus leopoldii 
Orbivestus teitensis 
Orbivestus turbinata 
Orbivestus undulatus 
Orbivestus unionis

References

Vernonieae
Asteraceae genera